Muccia is a comune (municipality) in the Province of Macerata in the Italian region Marche, located about  southwest of Ancona and about  southwest of Macerata.

Geography
Muccia borders with the following municipalities: Camerino, Pieve Torina, Pievebovigliana and Serravalle di Chienti. Its territory includes 7 frazioni (civil parishes): Col di Giove, Costafiore, Giove, Maddalena, Massaprofoglio, Rocchetta and Vallicchio.

Demographic evolution

References

External links

 Muccia official website

Cities and towns in the Marche